Luz Eufemia Vela Gutiérrez, better known as Lucé Vela, (born 1961) is the wife of former Governor of Puerto Rico Luis Fortuño. She was the First Lady, a position she held while her husband was in office from 2009 to 2013.

Education and personal life
Lucé Vela was born in San Juan, Puerto Rico, in 1961.

Vela obtained a Bachelor of Arts in Communications with a minor concentration in French from Goucher College in Baltimore. She later obtained a Juris Doctor degree from the Inter American University of Puerto Rico School of Law.

She married Luis Fortuño on August 3, 1984 The couple are the parents of triplets, María Luisa, Guillermo Luis and Luis Roberto.

Professional career
Vela first commenced her legal career working for the Law Firm of Martínez, Odell, & Calabria. In 2000, she established her own private practice, specializing in real estate and as a notary public.

First Lady of Puerto Rico
Vela began her tenure as First Lady of Puerto Rico after her husband, Luis Fortuño, was sworn in as Governor in 2009, following the 2008 general elections. Her charitable work involved education, family values, and women's health.

Notes

References

Living people
Date of birth missing (living people)
1961 births
First Ladies and Gentlemen of Puerto Rico
Interamerican University of Puerto Rico alumni
Goucher College alumni
Politicians from Madrid
Spanish emigrants to the United States